In-Cell Charge Control or I-C3 is a method for very rapid charging of a Nickel-metal hydride battery, patented by Rayovac. Batteries using this technology are commonly sold as "15-minute rechargeables".

The charge control consists of a pressure switch built into the cell, which disconnects the charging current when the internal cell pressure rises above a certain limit (usually 200 to 300 psi or 1.4 to 2.1 MPa). This prevents overcharging and damage to the cell.

Sources
 

Battery charging